The 2017 FIS Ski Jumping Grand Prix was the 24th Summer Grand Prix season in ski jumping on plastic for men and the 6th for ladies.

Other competitive circuits this season included the World Cup, Continental Cup, FIS Cup, FIS Race and Alpen Cup.

Map of grand prix hosts
All eight scheduled locations for men (8) and for ladies (2) in this season. Only Almaty was canceled before the season start.

Calendar

Men

Ladies

Men's team

Men's standings

Overall

Nations Cup

Prize money

Ladies' standings

Overall

Nations Cup

Prize money

Footnotes

References 

Grand Prix
FIS Grand Prix Ski Jumping